is a  railway station located in the town of Yamanobe, Yamagata Prefecture, Japan, operated by the East Japan Railway Company (JR East).

Lines
Uzen-Yamabe Station is served by the Aterazawa Line, and is located 6.5 rail kilometers from the terminus of the line at Kita-Yamagata Station.

Station layout 
The station has a single island platforms connected to the station building by a footbridge. The station is unattended

Platforms

History
Uzen-Yamabe Station began operation on July 20, 1921. A new station building was completed in November 1940. With the privatization of the JNR on April 1, 1987, the station came under the control of the East Japan Railway Company.

Passenger statistics
In fiscal 2017, the station was used by an average of 797 passengers daily (boarding passengers only).

Surrounding area

Yamanobe Town Hall
Yamanobe High School
Yamanobe Elementary School

Bus
 Yamanobe municipal Bus

References

External links 

  Uzen-Yamabe Station (JR East) 

Railway stations in Yamagata Prefecture
Aterazawa Line
Railway stations in Japan opened in 1921
Yamanobe, Yamagata